Mineola (also Minieola) is an unincorporated community in Howard County, Arkansas, United States. On April 24, 2011, an EF1 tornado traveled from Umpire to Mineola parallel to Arkansas Highway 84, damaging a few structures. The tornado was on the back end of a period of heighted tornado activity that led directly into the 2011 Super Outbreak that began on April 25.

References

Unincorporated communities in Howard County, Arkansas
Unincorporated communities in Arkansas